, abbreviated as Hizakurige and known in translation as Shank's Mare, is a comic picaresque novel (kokkeibon) written by Jippensha Ikku (十返舎一九, 1765–1831) about the misadventures of two travelers on the Tōkaidō, the main road between Kyoto and Edo during the Edo period. The book was published in twelve parts between 1802 and 1822.

The two main characters, traveling from Edo to Kyoto on their pilgrimage to Ise Grand Shrine, are called Yajirobē (彌次郎兵衛) and Kitahachi (喜多八).  The book, while written in a comical style, was written as a traveler's guide to the Tōkaidō Road.  It details famous landmarks at each of the 53 post towns along the road, where the characters, often called Yaji and Kita, frequently find themselves in hilarious situations.  They travel from station to station, predominantly interested in food, sake, and women.  As Edo men, they view the world through an Edo lens, deeming themselves more cultured and savvy in comparison to the countrymen they meet.  

Hizakurige is comic novel that also provides information and anecdotes regarding various regions along the Tōkaidō.  Tourism was booming during the Edo Period, when this was written.  This work is one of many guidebooks that proliferated, to whet the public's appetite for sight-seeing. 

A second book was also written, called Zoku Hizakurige, which includes material on the Kiso Valley, Konpira, and Miyajima.  

Some of the episodes from this novel have been illustrated by famous ukiyo-e artists, such as Hiroshige in his One Hundred Views of Edo.

Yaji and Kita's travels

As they make their way, they leave behind a trail of crude jokes and plentiful puns. They make fun of a daimyō procession, cheat shopkeepers out of money, and get cheated in turn.  At one inn, they make fools of themselves because they do not know how to use the bathtub; they burn themselves on the bottom, rather than asking for help.  

In Ueno, one of them pretends to be Ikku himself, before he is found to be an impostor.  On that occasion, they burn themselves and debate how to eat the hot stones that they have been served by the innkeeper.  They are soon revealed as fools: The stones are for drying out the konjac to improve the flavor, not for eating.    

Comic events often ensue when Yaji or Kita try to sneak into bed with women, which happens at various inns along the road.

Film versions
 Yaji and Kita: Yasuda's Rescue, 1927 film version
 Yaji and Kita: The Battle of Toba Fushimi, 1928 film version
 Travel Chronicles of Yaji and Kita, 1956 film version
 Yaji and Kita: The Midnight Pilgrims (2005)
 Yaji Kita dōchū Teresuko ("Three for the Road") (2007) starring Akira Emoto, Kyōko Koizumi, Nakamura Kanzaburō XVIII and a Japanese raccoon dog.

Sources

Jippensha Ikku, Hizakurige or Shanks' Mare, trans. Thomas Satchell (Charles E. Tuttle Company, Inc., 1960).  ASIN: B0007J7ITK.
Jippensha Ikku, Travels on the Eastern Seaboard (Tōkaidōchū Hizakurige), in Haruo Shirane, ed., Early Modern Japanese Literature: An Anthology, 1600–1900 (Columbia University Press, 2002), pp. 732–747.  .

External links

Dōchū hizakurige, selections, with print illustrations by Tamenobu Fujikawa
Tokaidochu hizakurige, 1907 edition published by Yohodo

1802 novels
Kokkeibon
Japanese serial novels
Edo-period works
Picaresque novels
Travel books
Novels set in Japan